Huai Khwang station (code BL18) is a MRT station on the Blue Line in Bangkok, Thailand. It is located under Ratchadaphisek Road, near the MRT Depot. Before the station was opened, its planned name was Pracha Rat Bamphen, but it was changed to Huai Khwang later. The station's symbol is color  orange.

Station details 
Huai Khwang is underground station, widths 23 meters, lengths 226 meters, depths 19 meters, and use island platform.

There is MetroMall in the station, but not opened yet.

References 

MRT (Bangkok) stations
Railway stations opened in 2004
2004 establishments in Thailand